The Mitre is a Grade II listed public house at 24 Craven Terrace, Lancaster Gate, Bayswater, City of Westminster.

It was built in the mid-19th century. It has traditional wooden bar furniture with original etched glass and mosaic floors. An upstairs dining and function room has been added as well as a downstairs speakeasy-style bar.

It is part of the Young's Brewery estate.

References

Grade II listed pubs in the City of Westminster
Bayswater